Anethum is a flowering plant genus in the family Apiaceae, native to the Middle East and the Sahara in northern Africa.

Taxonomy 
The genus name comes from the Latin form of Greek words  anison,  anīson,  anīthon and  anīton, which all meant "dill" and "anise"; anise is now placed in a different genus named Pimpinella.

Species 
There are 4 recognised species in this genus, they are:
 Anethum graveolens L. – dill
 Anethum involucratum Korovin
 Anethum patulum L. ex B.D.Jacks.
 Anethum theurkauffii Maire

References 

Apioideae
Apioideae genera